Pocklington's algorithm is a technique for solving a congruence of the form

where x and a are integers and a is a quadratic residue.

The algorithm is one of the first efficient methods to solve such a congruence. It was described by H.C. Pocklington in 1917.

The algorithm
(Note: all  are taken to mean , unless indicated otherwise.)

Inputs:
 p, an odd prime
 a, an integer which is a quadratic residue .

Outputs:
 x, an integer satisfying . Note that if x is a solution, −x is a solution as well and since p is odd, . So there is always a second solution when one is found.

Solution method
Pocklington separates 3 different cases for p:

 , 2 is a (quadratic) non-residue so . Hence  or, if y is odd, .

The third case, if , put , so the equation to solve becomes . Now find by trial and error  and  so that  is a quadratic non-residue. Furthermore, let
.
The following equalities now hold:
.
Now the equations
 
give a solution .

Let . Then . The case  with m odd is impossible, because  holds and this would mean that  is congruent to a quadratic non-residue, which is a contradiction. So this loop stops when  for a particular l. This gives , and because  is a quadratic residue, l must be even. Put . Then .

Examples
The following are 4 examples, corresponding to the 3 different cases in which Pocklington divided forms of p. All  are taken with the modulus in the example.

Example 0

This is the first case, according to the algorithm, 
, but then  not 43, so we should not apply the algorithm at all. The reason why the algorithm is not applicable is that a=43 is a quadratic non residue for p=47.

Example 1
Solve the congruence

The modulus is 23. The solution should be , which is indeed true: .

Example 2
Solve the congruence

The modulus is 13. Now verifying . This is indeed true: .

Example 3
Solve the congruence . For this, write . Take for example . Now find ,  by computing

And similarly  such that 

Since , the equation  which leads to solving the equation . This has solution . Indeed, .

References
 Leonard Eugene Dickson, "History Of The Theory Of Numbers" vol 1 p 222, Chelsea Publishing 1952

Modular arithmetic
Number theoretic algorithms